Morchella guatemalensis is a species of ascomycete fungus in the family Morchellaceae. Described as new to science in 1985, it is found in Chimaltenango Department (Guatemala), where it grows in oak and cypress woodland. The fruit body has a white stipe and orangish cap.

References

External links

guatemalensis
Edible fungi
Fungi described in 1985
Fungi of Central America